Valery Marov (born 17 November 1993) is a Belarusian professional football player .

References

External links
 
 
 Profile at teams.by

1993 births
Living people
Belarusian footballers
Association football midfielders
FC Smolevichi players
FC Torpedo-BelAZ Zhodino players
FC Orsha players
FC Luch Minsk (2012) players
FC UAS Zhitkovichi players
People from Barysaw
Sportspeople from Minsk Region